Donna Hay  (born 28 January 1971) is an Australian food stylist, author and magazine editor.

Cookbooks 
She is best known as the author of 27 bestselling cookbooks, including the new easy, the new classics, fresh and light, fast, fresh, simple, off the shelf, modern classics (books 1 and 2), the instant cook, "Basics to Brilliance" and Basics to Brilliance: Kids. Selling over 6 million copies worldwide, her books are known for their simple recipes and beautiful photography. She was named one of the 'Magnificent Seven' cookbook authors by the judges of the Gourmand World Cookbook Awards in January 2007. Her most recent book, everyday fresh, was released in October 2020.

Publishing
Hay also served as Editor-in-Chief of Donna Hay Magazine, a bi-monthly magazine launched in 2001, which closed after 100 issues in July 2018. She was the Food Editor for Marie Claire magazine when it launched in Australia, as well as six months as Food Editor at The Age and The Sydney Morning Herald.

Homewares collection 
She also has her own homewares range, sold via her online store at donnahay.com.

Television 
In March 2011, Hay's first television series, Fast, Fresh, Simple, launched on The LifeStyle Channel. Fast, Fresh, Simple is a 13-part series that features many of the recipes from her book of the same name. Donna has also appeared many times as a guest judge on MasterChef Australia, which airs on Network Ten. May 2016 her new TV series called "Donna Hay – Basics to Brilliance" aired on Lifestyle Food Foxtel, followed by "Basics to Brilliance: Kids" in 2017.

Honours and recognition 
Hay was awarded the Medal of the Order of Australia (OAM) in the 2022 Queen's Birthday Honours for "service to the food and hospitality sector as a cook and author".

References

External links
Donna Hay Magazine Official Site
Donna Hay profile on Harper Collins website
Donna Hay bio

Australian chefs
Australian magazine editors
Women cookbook writers
Living people
1971 births
Women magazine editors
Recipients of the Medal of the Order of Australia